This is a list of video games published, developed and/or distributed by Destination Software.

0-9
1 vs. 100 (2008) Nintendo DS

A
The Aly & AJ Adventure (2007) Nintendo DS
Arctic Tale (2007) Game Boy Advance, Nintendo DS, Wii
 ATV: Thunder Ridge Riders (2006) Game Boy Advance
 ATV: Thunder Ridge Riders / Monster Trucks Mayhem (2008) Nintendo DS

B
B-17: Fortress in the Sky (2007) Nintendo DS
Baldur's Gate: Dark Alliance (2004) Game Boy Advance
Balls of Fury (2007) Nintendo DS, Wii
Barnyard Blast: Swine of the Night (2008) Nintendo DS
Battleship/Connect Four/Sorry!/Trouble (2006) Nintendo DS
Betty Boop's Double Shift (2007) Nintendo DS
Big Mutha Truckers (2005) Game Boy Advance, Nintendo DS
 Board Game Classics (2005) Game Boy Advance

C
 CandyLand / Chutes & Ladders / Memory (2005) Game Boy Advance
 Centipede / Breakout / Warlords (2005) Game Boy Advance
Championship Pony (2008) Nintendo DS
Chess Crusade (2008) Nintendo DS, Nintendo Wii
Chicken Shoot (2007) Nintendo DS, Nintendo Wii
 Chicken Shoot 1 (2005) Game Boy Advance
 Chicken Shoot 2 (2005) Game Boy Advance
 Clue / Mouse Trap / Perfection / Aggravation (2007) Nintendo DS
 Command and Destroy  (2008) Nintendo DS
 Connect Four / Perfection / Trouble (2005) Game Boy Advance

D
Deal or No Deal (2007) Game Boy Advance, Nintendo DS
 Double Sequence: The Q-Virus Invasion (2008) Nintendo DS
Dr. Seuss: How The Grinch Stole Christmas! (2007) Nintendo DS

F
F1 2002 (2002) Game Boy Advance
Ford Racing 3 (2005) Game Boy Advance, Nintendo DS
Freekstyle (2003) Game Boy Advance
 Frisbee Disc Freestyle / Frisbee Disc Golf (2007) Game Boy Advance, Nintendo DS

G
The Game of Life/Yahtzee/Payday (2005) Game Boy Advance
Garfield Gets Real (2009) Nintendo DS, Wii
Garfield's Fun Fest (2008) Nintendo DS
 Gauntlet / Rampart (2005) Game Boy Advance
Gekido Advance: Kintaro's Revenge (2003) Game Boy Advance

H
 Harlem Globetrotters: World Tour (2006) Game Boy Advance, Nintendo DS
 Hot Wheels: All Out (2006) Game Boy Advance
 Hot Wheels: Stunt Track Challenge / World Race (2006) Game Boy Advance
 Hot Wheels Ultimate Racing (2007) PlayStation Portable

J
Jeep Thrills (2008) Wii, PlayStation 2

K
 KerPlunk / Toss Across / Tip It (2006) Game Boy Advance
 Kien (2004) Game Boy Advance
Kill Switch (2004) Game Boy Advance
 Killer 3D Pool (2005) Game Boy Advance

L
Lionel Trains On Track (2006) Nintendo DS

M
M&M's Break' Em (2007) Game Boy Advance, Nintendo DS
M&M's Kart Racing (2007) Nintendo DS, Wii
 Marble Madness / Klax (2005) Game Boy Advance
March of the Penguins (2006) Game Boy Advance, Nintendo DS
 Matchbox Missions: Air, Land & Sea Rescue / Emergency Response (2006) Game Boy Advance
Medal of Honor: Underground (2002) Game Boy Advance
Midnight Club: Street Racing (2001) Game Boy Advance
 Millipede / Super Breakout / Lunar Lander (2005) Game Boy Advance
 Monopoly (2004) Game Boy Advance
 Monster Trucks Mayhem (2006) Game Boy Advance
 Mouse Trap / Operation / Simon (2005) Game Boy Advance
Ms. Pac-Man Maze Madness (2004) Game Boy Advance
 Ms. Pac-Man Maze Madness / Pac-Man World (2005) Game Boy Advance

N
Need for Speed: Porsche Unleashed (2004) Game Boy Advance

O
 Original Frisbee Disc Sports: Ultimate & Golf (2007) Nintendo DS

P
Pac-Man Pinball Advance (2005) Game Boy Advance
Pac-Man World (2004) Game Boy Advance
Pac-Man World 2 (2005) Game Boy Advance
 Paperboy / Rampage (2005) Game Boy Advance
Payback (2004) Game Boy Advance
 Polly Pocket: Super Splash Island (2003) Game Boy Advance
 Pong / Asteroids / Yar's Revenge (2005) Game Boy Advance
 Princess Natasha: Student, Secret Agent, Princess (2006) Game Boy Advance, Nintendo DS

R
R-Type III: The Third Lightning (2004) Game Boy Advance
 Risk / Battleship / Clue (2005) Game Boy Advance
Road Rash: Jailbreak (2003) Game Boy Advance
Rock 'Em Sock 'Em Robots (2006) Game Boy Advance

S
 Scrabble Blast! (2005) Game Boy Advance
Sea Monsters: A Prehistoric Adventure (2007) Nintendo DS, Wii, PlayStation 2
Shining Stars: Super Starcade (2008) Nintendo DS
 Showtime Championship Boxing (2007) Nintendo DS, Wii
SimCity 2000 (2003) Game Boy Advance
Smashing Drive (2004) Game Boy Advance
Smuggler's Run (2002) Game Boy Advance
Snood (2001) Game Boy Advance
 Snood 2: On Vacation (2005) Game Boy Advance, Nintendo DS
 Sorry! / Aggravation / Scrabble Junior  (2005) Game Boy Advance
 Spy Hunter / Super Sprint (2005) Game Boy Advance
 Street Jam Basketball (2004) Game Boy Advance

T
 Tiger Woods PGA Tour Golf (2002) Game Boy Advance

U
 Uno 52 (2006) Game Boy Advance, Nintendo DS
Uno Free Fall (2007) Game Boy Advance
 Uno / Skip-Bo (2006) Game Boy Advance
 Uno/Skip-Bo/Uno Freefall (2006) Nintendo DS

W
Wade Hixton's Counter Punch (2004) Game Boy Advance
 Wiffle Ball (2007) Nintendo DS
Wing Commander: Prophecy (2003) Game Boy Advance

Y
Yamaha Supercross (2008) Nintendo DS, Wii, PlayStation 2, Windows

Destination Software